The Gala Water (Lowland Scots: Gala Watter; Scottish Gaelic An Geal Ath) is a river in the Scottish Borders area of Scotland and a tributary of the River Tweed. It is sometimes known as the "Gala", which nickname is also shared with Galashiels, which it flows through. The "Braw Lads O Gala Watter" is a song about people from Galashiels.

Etymology
The name Gala may be from the Old English galga meaning "gallows" (Scots galwe), perhaps by back-formation from Galashiels. Or else, Gala may originally be from Brittonic, and derived from *gāl meaning "enmity, hatred" (Welsh gâl), or cognate to the Welsh verb galw, "call" (Cornish galow, "a call"). The river may share an etymology with Gala Lane in Ayrshire, which flows into Loch Doon.

Levels

See also
List of places in the Scottish Borders
Leader Water

Gallery

References

Rivers of the Scottish Borders
1Gala